In biology and ecology, a resource is a substance or object in the environment required by an organism for normal growth, maintenance, and reproduction. Resources box can be consumed by one organism and, as a result, become unavailable to another organism. For plants key resources are light, nutrients, water, and place to grow. For animals key resources are food, water, and territory.

Key resources for plants

Terrestrial plants require particular resources for photosynthesis and to complete their life cycle of germination, growth, reproduction, and dispersal: 
 Carbon dioxide
 Microsite (ecology)
 Nutrients
 Pollination
 Seed dispersal
 Soil
 Water

Key resources for animals

Animals require particular resources for metabolism and to complete their life cycle of gestation, birth, growth, and reproduction:

 Foraging
 Territory
 Water

Resources and ecological processes

Resource availability plays a central role in ecological processes:

 Carrying capacity
 Biological competition
 Liebig's law of the minimum
 Niche differentiation

See also

 Abiotic component
 Biotic component
 Community ecology
 Ecology
 Population ecology
 Plant ecology
 size-asymmetric competition

References

Biological concepts
Biological interactions
Ecology terminology